Byrma is a rural locality (a village) in Osintsevskoye Rural Settlement, Kishertsky District, Perm Krai, Russia. The population was 174 as of 2010.

Geography 
Byrma is located on the Byrma River, 35 km southeast of Ust-Kishert (the district's administrative centre) by road. Brazhata is the nearest rural locality.

References 

Rural localities in Kishertsky District